Luigi Pedrazzini (born July 20, 1909 in Milan) was an Italian professional football player.

Honours
 Serie A champion: 1929/30.

1909 births
Year of death missing
Italian footballers
Serie A players
Atalanta B.C. players
U.S. Cremonese players
Inter Milan players
U.S. Catanzaro 1929 players
Italian expatriate footballers
Expatriate footballers in Switzerland
Italian expatriate sportspeople in Switzerland
Servette FC players
FC Chiasso players
Association football midfielders